The West Florida Argonauts (or UWF Argonauts) are the athletic teams that represent the University of West Florida, located in Pensacola, Florida, in intercollegiate sports at the Division II level of the National Collegiate Athletic Association (NCAA), primarily competing in the Gulf South Conference (GSC) since the 1994–95 academic year. The Argonauts previously competed in the Southern States Conference of the National Association of Intercollegiate Athletics (NAIA) from 1974–75 to 1993–94, with a brief hiatus of dropping its athletics program from 1976–77 to 1979–80.

West Florida competes in 15 intercollegiate varsity sports: Men's sports include baseball, basketball, cross country, football, golf, soccer and tennis; while women's sports include basketball, cross country, golf, soccer, softball, swimming and diving, tennis and volleyball.

Football

UWF made the decision to add a football program in 2013. The Argos signed their first recruiting class in February 2015 and the fall of 2015 featured practice and intrasquad scrimmages. The first year of varsity competition was the 2016 season. The Argos’ first home game was on September 10, 2016, at Blue Wahoos Stadium against Missouri S&T Miners. In 2017, the Argonauts advanced to the national championship game, where they lost to Texas A&M–Commerce 37–27. In 2019, West Florida won their first national title when they defeated Minnesota State 48–40.

Program achievements

Baseball
West Florida has had 18 Major League Baseball Draft selections since the draft began in 1965.

Achievements

NCAA Division II Team National Championships (9)
Baseball: 2011
 Football: 2019
 Men's Golf: 2001, 2008
 Men's Tennis: 2004, 2005, 2014, 2017
 Women's Soccer: 2012

NAIA Team National Championships (1)
 Softball: 1993

Gulf South Conference All Sports Trophies (30)
 Men's: 8 (97-98, 02–03, 06–07, 11–12, 12–13, 15–16, 16–17, 17–18)
 Women's: 16 (97-98, 98–99, 03–04, 05–06, 06–07, 07–08, 08–09, 09–10, 10–11, 11–12, 12–13, 13–14, 14–15, 15–16, 16–17, 18–19)
 Overall (started in 2013–14): 6 (13–14, 14–15, 15–16, 16–17, 17–18, 18–19)

NCAA Division II Individual National Championships (18)
 Men's Golf – Orjan Larsen (1998)
 Men's Golf - Chandler Blanchet (2017)
 Women's Swimming & Diving - Monica Amaral (2016 1-Meter & 3-Meter Diving)
 Women's Swimming & Diving - Theresa Michalak (2016 100-Yard Breaststroke)
 Women's Swimming & Diving - Monica Amaral (2017 1-Meter & 3-Meter Diving)
 Women's Swimming & Diving - Theresa Michalak (2017 50-Yard Freestyle, 100-Yard Freestyle, 100-Yard Breaststroke, 100 Butterfly)
 Men's Tennis – Jens Gerlach/Matt Wallhead (1996)
 Men's Tennis – Radovan Chrz (2000 – ITA Singles, ITA "Super Bowl")
 Men's Tennis – Radovan Chrz (2000 – ITA Singles)
 Men's Tennis – Bruno Savi (2013 – ITA Singles)
 Men's Tennis - Alex Peyrot/Pedro Dumont (2016 - ITA Doubles)
 Women's Tennis - Berta Bonardi (2018 - ITA Singles)
 Women's Tennis - Berta Bonardi (2019 - ITA Singles)

NAIA Individual National Championships: (6)
 Men's Cross Country – John Viitanen (1996 – Marathon)
 Men's Tennis – Eric Hochman (1990 – Singles)
 Men's Tennis – Eric Hochman/Geoffrey Watts (1991 – Doubles)
 Men's Tennis – Sorin Cherebetiu/Andrej Tonejc (1992 – Doubles)
 Women's Tennis – Bronna Allison/Laura Cadena (1988 – Doubles)
 Women's Tennis – Bronna Allison (1989 – Singles)

Conference Championships (115)

Gulf South Conference Championships (109)
 Baseball: 2 (2007, 2021)
 Football: 2 (2021, 2022)
 Men's Basketball: 1 (2018)
 Men's Cross Country: 2 (1994, 1996)
 Men's Golf: 18 (1995-98, 2001-03, 2006-08, 2011, 2013-19, 2021)
 Men's Soccer: 10 (1998, 2001, 2003, 2006-10, 2013, 2021)
 Men's Tennis: 14 (1995, 1997-99, 2002-03, 2005-06, 2012-15, 2017, 2022)
 Softball: 4 (1998, 2004-05, 2019)
 Volleyball: 11 (2008-13, 2017-19, 2021-22)
 Women's Basketball: 1 (2014)
 Women's Cross Country: 3 (1996, 2011-12)
 Women's Golf: 11 (2006-10, 2012-16, 2021)
 Women's Soccer: 11 (1996, 1998-99, 2006, 2008-10, 2012-13, 2016, 2018)
 Women's Tennis: 19 (1995-96, 1998-99, 2000-02, 2006-07, 2009, 2011-19)

New South Intercollegiate Swimming and Diving Conference Championships (6) 
 Women's Swimming and Diving: 6 (2015-16, 2020-23)

Gulf South Conference Commissioner's Trophies (8)
 Krissy Styrna - Softball (2001–02)
 Kevin Warrick - Men's Golf (2002–03)
 Lindsay Nemanich - Women's Soccer (2006–07)
 Suzana Cavalcante - Women's Tennis (2007–08)
 Courtney Jones - Women's Soccer (2009–10)
 Kevin Ducros - Men's Tennis (2012–13)
 Autumn Duyn - Women's Volleyball (2015–16)
 Chandler Blanchet - Men's Golf (2017–18)

Gulf South Conference Hall of Fame (4)
 Richard Berg, Athletic Director - Class of 2014 (Inaugural Class)
 Radovan Chrz, Men's Tennis - Class of 2017
 Suzana Cavalcante, Women's Tennis - Class of 2018
 Kevin Warrick, Men's Golf - Class of 2019

Notable athletes
 Mickey Gorka (born 1972), Israeli basketball player and coach
 Moochie Norris graduated in 1996 and played in the NBA for many years.

References

External links